St. Anne School is a private and Roman Catholic school located in Laguna Niguel, California, United States Of America

History
St. Anne School was founded as a Christian school in accordance with the Roman Catholic tradition in 1992 by a group of parents, clergy and community leaders serving children of all faiths in pre-school through 8th grade. The original site was a leased parcel of land in Laguna Niguel with modular classrooms.

Phase I opened on September 12, 1996. On September 14, 1998, Phase II, a  multi-purpose building opened. This facility, called the Queen of Life Center, included classrooms, a gymnasium, chapel, kitchen, stage, locker rooms, and offices. On September 15, 1999, Phase III, named Christ the King, was occupied by the kindergarten through fourth grade students. The administrative offices and conference rooms were also a part of Phase III. The final phase, Mother Theresa Center, opened in March 2000. Mother Theresa Center houses the pre-school, daycare center, library, middle school, and specialty classrooms for art and music. Now complete, St. Anne School's  facility accommodates over 800 students in pre-school through eighth grade.

Demographics 
As of 2016, there are 761 students attending St Anne. These include:
 112 preschool students
 415 elementary students
 234 middle school students

51% of the school's students are female, and 49% are male.

There are 537 families, of which:
 47% are Catholic
 All reside in 16 local cities

There are 65 staff members:
 25% have advanced degrees
 1 guidance counselor
 1 school psychologist
 2 nurses
 1 librarian
 8:1 preschool student to teacher ratio
 12:1 pre-kindergarten to teacher ratio
 Class size of 25 target in kindergarten through 5th grade
 Class size of 8–26 in middle school

Athletics
St. Anne offers a wide variety of sports available for students in 4th-8th grade (flag football, girls' volleyball, boys' lacrosse, softball, coed soccer, girls'/boys' basketball, and boys'volleyball). St. Anne competes in the Parochial Athletic League (PAL). In 2007, the school began its inaugural lacrosse team and has achieved success ever since.

Academics
St. Anne School offers a vigorous academic course meant to challenge the minds of its students, who are required to not only be model students, but good Christians as well. Each student in middle school is required to complete 16 hours of community service. In middle school, students can participate in accelerated courses in mathematics, science, and literature.

External links
 Official website

Schools in Orange County, California
Laguna Niguel, California
Catholic elementary schools in California
Roman Catholic Diocese of Orange
Educational institutions established in 1992
1992 establishments in California